"" ("Our Fatherland") is the national anthem of Armenia. It was arranged by Barsegh Kanachyan; the lyrics were written by Mikayel Nalbandian. First adopted in 1918 as the anthem of the short-lived First Republic of Armenia, it was subsequently banned after the country was invaded by then incorporated into the Soviet Union. Following the dissolution of the Soviet Union and the restoration of sovereignty in 1991, the song was re-adopted as the national anthem, albeit with slightly modified lyrics.

History

Composition and first republic (until 1920)
The lyrics of "" were derived from "The Song of an Italian Girl", a poem written by Mikael Nalbandian in 1861., It is more well known by its incipit, "" ("Our Fatherland"). In the early 20th century, the music was composed by Barsegh Kanachyan. Subsequently, both the lyrics and music were adopted as the national anthem of the First Republic of Armenia, which briefly existed from 1918 to 1920.

Soviet era (1920–91)
The Red Army invaded Armenia in November 1920, in spite of the Treaty of Sèvres – which granted the country international recognition as a sovereign state – having been signed only three months earlier. In 1922, it was absorbed into the Transcaucasian Socialist Federative Soviet Republic (TSFSR), together with Azerbaijan and Georgia, and the TSFSR subsequently became part of the Soviet Union at the end of that same year. As an unmistakable symbol of Armenian nationalism, "" was outlawed by the Bolshevik authorities. In its place, the Anthem of the Armenian Soviet Socialist Republic was utilized from 1944 onwards. Because of this, "" took on a new status as a protest song against Soviet rule during this time.

Restoration of sovereignty and beyond (1991–present)
"" was reinstated as Armenia's national anthem on 1 July 1991 by the constituent republic's Supreme Soviet. The lyrics are not identical to the 1918 version, however, because several of the words have been modified. As an intrinsic element of civic education in Armenia, the anthem is one of several national symbols which feature prominently in the classrooms of the country's schools. By dignifying the song in this manner, teachers reckon that this "encourage[s] students to sing the national anthem every day".

A debate of the national anthem was a question in the Armenian Parliament in 2006 and 2019. The new government had called for the restoration of the Soviet era anthem with newer lyrics in its place.

Lyrics
The lyrics of "" promotes the worthiness of "dying for the freedom" of Armenia. Its discussion of death, however, has led several commentators to complain that the anthem is overly "wimpy" and "gloomy". Specifically, some members of the National Assembly are of the opinion that the song – written at the time of the first fight for independence – does not accurately reflect the present era of triumph and success. However, none of the proposals to replace "" have come to fruition, as the Armenian Revolutionary Federation (Dashnaktsutyun) – which were part of the coalition government – have so far resisted efforts to change the national anthem, especially proposals to replace it with one based on the music of the anthem of the Armenian SSR.

Current text

Original text
"" is based on the first, third, fourth and sixth stanzas of Nalbandian's poem The Song of an Italian Girl".

In popular culture
The title of the national anthem is used as the name of a television channel for Armenian expatriates residing in Russia. Mer Hayrenik TV is based in the city of Novosibirsk, the administrative centre of both Novosibirsk Oblast and the Siberian Federal District.

Notes

References

External links
State symbols of Armenia
Vocal version of "Mer Hayrenik" in MP3 format
Armenian part of nationalanthems.info: includes midi, lyrics, a music sheet

Armenian music
National symbols of Armenia
Asian anthems
European anthems
National anthems
National anthem compositions in F major
National anthem compositions in E-flat major